Kangarappady is a suburban region in Kochi, Kerala, India.

Institutions
The Government Medical College, Ernakulam, Ayurveda Hospital, Veterinary Hospital, Kangarappady Mini Town Hall, State Bank of India (Kangarappady), Sree Narayana Upper Primary School, Holycross Convent School Vidyodaya School, Suburban Club (Kangarappady), The Backyard-Activity Arena, busybee's kids indoor park, Jairaj Spectrum apartments, Motif Apartments, Gokulam Harmonia Apartments, DD Misty Hill apartments and Confident Atria 3 apartments are located in this region. There is a Bar attached hotel, Toddy shop, Royal Bakery food court, Bakery B shop, two supermarkets, Alepa Wood Pressed Coconut Oil Extraction Unit, three medical shop, two SBI ATM/CDM couter, tyre shop, Hi-tech diagnostic centre fruit & vegetable shops, Amul icecream parlor, Science park Kinfra Natural Products nutrition Shop etc. are found in Kangarappady.

Location
Kangarappady is 5 kilometer away from Edappally Toll junction and LuLu International Shopping Mall, 3 Kilometer away from Kakkanad Civil Station, InfoPark, Kochi and SmartCity, Kochi. it is 14 kilometer away from High Court of Kerala, 11 kilometer away from Kaloor and Ernakulam Town Railway station and 2.5 kilometer away from seaport-airport road. Cochin International Airport is only 18 kilometer away.

Administration
Kangarappady comes under the Kalamassery Legislative Assembly, Kalamassery Municipality and Trikkakara Police Station of Ernakulam District. Vadacode sub post office (682021) is located at Kangarappady Junction. The municipal ward number 17, 18, 19 and 20 belong to the kanagarappady region.Kangarappady is the only locality which owns a Govt Ayurvedic Hospital in the Municipality Limits. Kangarappady is the fastest developing town in Kalamassery Municipality. The Municipality has new plans for the overall development of the Kangarappady region to make it as major attraction of the municipality.

Nearby places

Ponnakudam Bhagavathy Temple is one of the oldest temple in Kalamassery Municipality. The temple is located at Thevakkal in Kanayannur taluk of Ernakulam district in South Indian state of kerala. The temple is situated about 1 Km from Kangarappady and 2 km from Kalamassery Government Medical College. Ponnakudam Bhagavathy Kshetram, is a traditional Hindu temple, dedicated to goddess Sree Vana Durga The major attraction of the temple is surrounded by thick forest. Many followers of the theory of kerala's genesis by parasurama firmly believe that he had established 108 Durga temples, 108 Siva temples, numerous sastha temples, Ponnakudam Bhagavathi temple is one among the 108 Durga temples.

References 

Government Medical College, Ernakulam
Vidyodaya School

Villages in Ernakulam district